Violet Mary may refer to:

 Violet Crowther (1884–1969), British museum curator
 Violet Mary Doudney (1889–1952), teacher and militant suffragette
 Violet Mary Craig Roberton (1888–1954), Scottish politician and local councillor